Marième Badiane (born 24 November 1994) is a French basketball player for Lyon ASVEL Féminin and the French national team.

She participated at the 2018 FIBA Women's Basketball World Cup.

References

External links

1994 births
Living people
Centers (basketball)
French women's basketball players
Sportspeople from Brest, France